Austen Thomas Williams (born December 19, 1992) is an American former professional baseball pitcher who played for the Washington Nationals of Major League Baseball (MLB) in 2018 and 2019.

Career

After graduating from Southwest Christian School, Williams enrolled at Texas State University where he played college baseball. He was drafted by the Washington Nationals in the sixth round of the 2014 MLB draft. Williams struggled in 2016 and 2017, including in the Arizona Fall League, where he pitched for the Mesa Solar Sox. Moved from the rotation into the bullpen as a multi-inning reliever in 2018, Williams prospered for the Class-AA Harrisburg Senators, being named an Eastern League All-Star and earning a promotion by August to the Class-AAA Syracuse Chiefs for the first time.

After Williams posted a 1.19 ERA across 68 innings for Class-AA Harrisburg and Class-AAA Syracuse, the Nationals selected Williams' contract on September 1, 2018, adding him to the major league pitching staff following a trade that sent Gio González to the Milwaukee Brewers. He made his major league debut the next day, striking out two Brewers in two relief innings. He was outrighted to AAA on October 9, 2020. He became a free agent on November 2, 2020.

Pitching style
Since moving to the bullpen after the 2017 season, Williams has focused more on a fastball-slider combination while building his velocity.

References

External links

1992 births
Living people
Baseball players from Fort Worth, Texas
Major League Baseball pitchers
Washington Nationals players
Texas State Bobcats baseball players
Gulf Coast Nationals players
Auburn Doubledays players
Hagerstown Suns players
Potomac Nationals players
Harrisburg Senators players
Syracuse Chiefs players
Fresno Grizzlies players
Mesa Solar Sox players